Elmera is a monotypic genus of flowering plants belonging to the family Saxifragaceae. It contains one species, Elmera racemosa (S.Watson) Rydb..

Its native range is south-western Canada to north-western USA.

Its name is in honour of Adolph Daniel Edward Elmer (1870–1942), an American botanist and plant collector, it was first published and described in N.L.Britton & al. (eds.), N. Amer. Fl. Vol.22 on page 97 in 1905.
The specific epithet of racemosa is derived from 'racemus' meaning cluster.

The species has 2 known synonyms; Elmera racemosa var. puberulenta  and Heuchera racemosa .

References

Saxifragaceae
Saxifragaceae genera
Plants described in 1905
Flora of the United States
Flora of Canada